Siraitia is a genus of plants from the family Cucurbitaceae.  The following species have been assigned to it, at various times:
Siraitia africana, see Microlagenaria africana
Siraitia borneensis, see Baijiania borneensisSiraitia grosvenorii (luo han guo, monk's fruit), from China and ThailandSiraitia siamensis, from ThailandSiraitia sikkimensis, from IndiaSiraitia silomaradjae, from IndiaSiraitia taiwaniana, from Taiwan, see Sinobaijiania taiwaniana''

References

External links

Cucurbitaceae genera
Cucurbitoideae